Alban Ramaj (born 8 November 1985 in Peć) is a Kosovar retired football player who plays for German lower league side TSV Lengfeld.

References

1985 births
Living people
Sportspeople from Peja
Kosovo Albanians
Association football forwards
Kosovan footballers
Albanian footballers
TSV 1860 Munich II players
FC Energie Cottbus II players
Kickers Emden players
FC Erzgebirge Aue players
FC Carl Zeiss Jena players
Würzburger Kickers players
FC 08 Homburg players
SV Waldhof Mannheim players
2. Bundesliga players
3. Liga players
Regionalliga players
Kosovan expatriate footballers
Expatriate footballers in Germany
Kosovan expatriate sportspeople in Germany